Josiah "Jossy" Dombraye is a former Nigerian football forward and manager, most recently on the technical staff of Bayelsa United F.C.
He spent most of his career with Sharks F.C. and was part of the Nigeria national football team that won the 1973 All-Africa Games.

He was part of the Mid-Western State team that played Brazilian team Santos in 1969.

References

Warri Wolves' Confederation Cup ticket an act of God, says Pinnick
Bayelsa fail to pay players

Nigerian footballers
Sharks F.C. players
Living people
African Games gold medalists for Nigeria
African Games medalists in football
Association football wingers
Year of birth missing (living people)
Footballers at the 1973 All-Africa Games
Bayelsa United F.C. managers
Nigerian football managers